The City Streets were a Canadian independent rock and roll band from Edmonton, Alberta.

History
The City Streets self-released their debut full-length album, These Things Happen, in 2005. The band then went on a tour of Canada and the USA.  They followed with the full-length Concentrated Living and supported the album with two North American tours in 2008.

"Concentrated Living" entered !earshot, Canada's national campus radio chart, at No. 44 in November and also received a record number of plays on CJSR-FM, Edmonton's campus radio station.

"The Jazz Age" is the band's third full-length album, released in June 2010.   Winter Lightning was recorded with Howard Bilerman (Arcade Fire, Godspeed You Black Emperor) at Hotel2Tango in Montreal and released simultaneously with 'Sawdust & Rum' which was recorded and produced by the band themselves in a cabin in Nova Scotia. Winter Lightning was released on vinyl and Sawdust & Rum on CD.

Other releases include the EP's 'Peacemaker' with Myrol and 'Decline of the West'.

In 2012 the band released a video, "Tristesse". The City Streets announced their breakup spring of 2013.

Discography

Albums
 These Things Happen (2005)
 Concentrated Living (2008)
 The Jazz Age (2010)
 Winter Lightning (2012)
 Sawdust & Rum (2012)
 Pretenders (2013)

EPs
 If You Don't Like the Clash You're A Bad Person (2006)
 Movies Are For Retards 7" (2008)
 The Hipster Cull (2009)
 Decline of the West (2011) 
 Peacemaker (2011)

See also

Music of Canada
Canadian rock
List of bands from Canada
List of Canadian musicians
:Category:Canadian musical groups

References

External links
City Streets official website
VUE Weekly: Life on Tour with the City Streets
"Concentrated Living" on Kerfmusic
The City Streets on MySpace

Musical groups established in 2005
Canadian indie rock groups
Musical groups from Edmonton
2005 establishments in Alberta